Francesco Saverio Merlino (9 September 1856 – 30 June 1930) was an Italian lawyer, anarchist activist and theorist of libertarian socialism.

Life 
Merlino was born on 9 September 1856 in Naples. He was raised in the Neapolitan anarchist tradition. Merlino started to participate in the militant anarchist movement in Italy during his university studies.

Merlino attended the Anarchist Congress that met in London from 14 July 1881. Other delegates included Peter Kropotkin, Errico Malatesta, Marie Le Compte, Louise Michel and Émile Gautier. While respecting "complete autonomy of local groups", the congress defined propaganda actions that all could follow and agreed that "propaganda by the deed" was the path to social revolution.

In 1884, he went into exile in England and also travelled to the United States. After he returned to Italy in 1894, Merlino was arrested and had to spend two years in prison. 

The Belgian review La Société nouvelle published articles by Merlino in 1891 that took an anarchist viewpoint in criticizing Marxism and German socialism, but Merino also questioned anarchist principles. In 1897, his book Pro e contro il socialismo was published, reflecting his thoughts on the subject. In the following years, he developed his theory of libertarian socialism in arguments with his friend Errico Malatesta.

In 1900, he defended Gaetano Bresci, an Italian-American anarchist who assassinated King Umberto I in response to the Bava-Beccaris massacre. Despite killing the monarch, Bresci was not sentenced to death, making him the only person to ever kill a monarch (without toppling the monarchy) and not be executed.

In 1907, the Turin daily La Stampa published an interview with Merlino, who had recanted his anarchism. The interview, titled "The End of Anarchism", pronounced anarchism an obsolete doctrine, torn by internal disputes, bereft of first-rate theorists and doomed to extinction. Leading Italian-American anarchist Luigi Galleani would attack Merlino in his own article "The End of Anarchism?", adding a question mark.

Merlino died on 30 June 1930 in Rome.

Major works 
 Socialismo o monopolismo? (1887)
 L'Italie telle qu'elle est (1890)
 Necessità e basi di un accordo (1892) 
 L'individua-lismo nell'anarchismo (1893)
 Pro e contro il socialismo (1897)
 L’utopia collettivista e la crisi del "socialismo scientifico" (1898)
 Formes et essence du socialisme (1898)
 Fascismo e democrazia (1924) 
 Politica e Magistratura dal 1860 ad oggi in Italia (1925)
 Il socialismo senza Marx. Studi e polemiche per una revisione della dottrina socialista (1897–1930) – Massimiliano Boni (1974), Bologna
 Il problema economico e politico del socialismo. (1948)

References 
 Citations

 Sources

 
 

 Further reading

 Francesco Saverio Merlino: Tra anarchismo tradizionale e socialismo liberale. Interview with Gianpiero Landi, .
 Lucio Gabellini: Merlino: un socialismo "diverso" 
 Giampiero Domenico Berti: Francesco Saverio Merlino. Dall'anarchismo socialista al socialismo liberale (1856–1930).  Franco Angeli Editore Milano. Mailand 1993.
 Mirko Roberti: Il "riformismo rivoluzionario" di Saverio Merlino." Un'intelligenza critica tra marxismo e anarchismo. Il basilare dilemma socialista in un tentativo originale di mediare, in una sintesi eclittica e personale, le opposte istanze. 
 Franco Melandri: Un convegno su Francesco S. Merlino 

1856 births
1930 deaths
19th-century Neapolitan people
Anarcho-communists
Italian anarchists
20th-century Italian lawyers
Italian libertarians
Libertarian socialists
19th-century Italian lawyers